Sanicula crassicaulis is a species of flowering plant in the family Apiaceae known by the common names Pacific blacksnakeroot and Pacific sanicle. It is native to the west coast of North America from British Columbia to Baja California, where it can be found in many types of habitat, including mountain slopes, grassland, and woodlands. It is a perennial herb producing a thick stem up to 1.2 meters tall from a taproot. The leaves have blades up to 12 centimeters long which are divided into a few deep lobes and edged with small teeth. The inflorescence is made up of one or more heads of bisexual and male-only flowers with tiny, curving, yellow petals. Each head has approximately five leaflike, lance-shaped bracts at its base. The rounded fruits are a few millimeters long, covered in curving prickles, and borne in small clusters.

References

External links
Calflora Database: Sanicula crassicaulis (Pacific blacksnakeroot, Pacific sanicle, Gamble weed)
Jepson Manual Treatment
USDA Plants Profile
Washington Burke Museum
U.C. Photos gallery

crassicaulis
Flora of British Columbia
Flora of California
Flora of Baja California
Flora of the West Coast of the United States
Natural history of the California chaparral and woodlands
Natural history of the California Coast Ranges
Natural history of the Peninsular Ranges
Natural history of the Santa Monica Mountains
Natural history of the Transverse Ranges
Taxa named by Augustin Pyramus de Candolle
Taxa named by Eduard Friedrich Poeppig
Flora without expected TNC conservation status